Mbum Proper (also Mboum, Buna, Mboumtiba and Wuna) is a Adamawa–Ubangi language of Central Africa. It is spoken by about  people in Cameroon and the Central African Republic.

History
The Mbum language is spoken by the Mbum people who inhabit Cameroon, the Central African Republic, and Chad. While their origins are unclear, some believe that the Mbum were one of the earliest ethnic groups of the Adamawa Region. The Mbum of Tibati claim to be ancestors of the Tikar people, who may have once been known as the Mboum people. However, this belief is disputed by some historians, linguists, and anthropologists who believe other groups attached themselves to the Tikar and Kirdi people as a political move to provide legitimacy to their claim of dynastic lineage.

Professor and social anthropologist David Zeitlyn studied the theories of Tikar origin put forward by several historians, including Eldridge Mohammadou. Exploring those origin theories, Zeitlyn stated that "The main question at issue is the origin of the founders of the dynasties and the palace institutions of the different Tikar-speaking groups. How much credit is to be given to claims of Mbum origin? To answer this, a variety of evidence must be considered, including oral tradition and historical linguistics." 

The Mbum people have such a close relationship with the Dii people, and one which has persisted for so long, that outsiders often have a hard time distinguishing them. In the early nineteenth century, both groups came under the rule of the Fulani Muslims, who they are said to have intermarried in large numbers. Despite this, the Mbum and Dii peoples still managed to hold on to their traditional spiritual beliefs until the twentieth century. The Mbum converted to Islam, while the Dii converted to Christianity.

Varieties
Mbum is a complex dialect continuum consisting of several varieties. ALCAM (2012) considers Mbum, Larang, Pana and Gbata to be four distinct but closely related languages. Pana (also spoken in Chad), Karang, Kali-dek and Kuo are eastern varieties that may be separate languages.

To the south, Gbata is spoken in the northern part of the arrondissement of Bélabo in Lom-et-Djerem department, Eastern Region. There, it is spoken in Woutchaba and Deng-Deng, located to the west and east of the Sanaga River, respectively. Blench (2006) considers Gbete (Gbata) to be a separate language.

The LiMbum is spoken to the South West especially in the Donga Mantung and around the Nkambe and Ndu Sub Divisions.

Distribution
Mbum is spoken in:

Adamaoua Region
Vina department (Ngaoundéré and Mbe communes)
Djerem department (Ngaoundal and Tibati communes)
Faro-et-Déo department (Tignère communes)
North Region
Mayo-Rey department (Touboro commune)
Faro department (Poli commune)
 North West Region*
Limbum is spoken in the Donga Mantung Particularly in Ndu and Nkambe Subdivisions.

References

Roger Blench, 2004. List of Adamawa languages (ms)

External links
 A rapid appraisal survey of Gbete by Jason Diller & Kari Jordan-Diller, 2002. SIL Electronic Survey Reports SILESR 2002-050.

Languages of Cameroon
Mbum languages